The Masonic Hall building is located at  503 Third Avenue in Whitewood, Saskatchewan, Canada.   The building is a designated Heritage Property.  Originally built to house the Methodist Church in served as church until 1910.  Masonic Lodge purchased the building in 1920 and it served as the home for the lar Masonic Lodge #8 until 1987 when the lodge merged with a lodge in Moosomin, Saskatchewan.  The building is now used as local hall in the community.

References 

Masonic buildings completed in 1892
Buildings and structures in Saskatchewan
Whitewood, Saskatchewan
Heritage sites in Saskatchewan